Vitolište (Macedonian: Витолиште) is a village in the Prilep Municipality of North Macedonia. It used to be a municipality itself and its FIPS code was MKB5. It is the largest village in the Mariovo region.

Demographics
According to the 2002 census, the village had a total of 170 inhabitants. Ethnic groups in the village include:

Macedonians 167
Serbs 2
Others 1

References

Villages in Prilep Municipality